The Budd RB-1 Conestoga was a twin-engine, stainless steel cargo aircraft designed for the United States Navy during World War II by the Budd Company of Philadelphia, Pennsylvania. Although it did not see service in a combat theater, it pioneered design innovations in American cargo aircraft, later incorporated in modern military cargo airlifters.

Design and development
World War II created a great demand for military transport aircraft in the United States. Because of initial fears of a shortage of aluminum, the War Department explored the use of other materials for aircraft construction. Budd, the developer of the shotweld technique for welding stainless steel and a manufacturer of stainless steel railroad cars, automobile, bus, and truck bodies, hired an aeronautical engineering staff and worked with the U. S. Navy to develop a new twin-engine transport aircraft constructed primarily of stainless steel.  The U.S. Navy accepted the proposal for the new aircraft, and placed an order for 200, to be designated RB-1. The U.S. Army Air Forces (USAAF) followed with an order for 600, designated C-93.

The Conestoga was a twin-engine high-wing monoplane with tricycle landing gear. The elevated flight deck was contained in a distinctive, almost hemispherical nose section. Its two  Pratt & Whitney R-1830-92 air cooled 14-cylinder, twin-row, radial engines, the same engines fitted to the C-47, drove three-bladed Hamilton Standard Hydromatic constant-speed, full-feathering propellers and powered a 24-volt electrical system.  While the fuselage was thin-gauge stainless steel, only a portion of the wing was made of the metal; the trailing section of the wing and all control surfaces were fabric-covered.

Innovations

The RB-1/C-93 was radical for its day, introducing many of the features now standard in military transports. The flight deck could accommodate three crew members, pilot and copilot side-by-side, the navigator behind them. Cargo loading and unloading could be accomplished in two ways: through 40 × 60 inch (102 × 152 cm) doors on both sides of the fuselage or by an electrically operated 10 × 8 foot (3.0 × 2.4 m) ramp at the aft end of the cargo area under the upswept tail, a similar development to what had been initially fitted to the Germans' own Ju 90 four-engined transport aircraft as their Trapoklappe ramp in 1939. The RB-1's loading ramp, accessed by manually operated clamshell doors, along with the tricycle landing gear, meant cargo could be loaded/unloaded at truck-bed height. A manually operated two-ton (1814 kg) hoist for unloading trucks and a one-ton winch for pulling cargo up the ramp were also provided in the cargo area. The aircraft could accommodate:
24 paratroopers, or
24 stretchers and 16 sitting wounded, or
9,600 pounds of cargo, or
a 1½ ton truck, or
The largest ambulance in use by the U.S. military.

Operational history
The prototype first flew from the Budd Red Lion Factory Airfield in Philadelphia, Pennsylvania on 31 October 1943, piloted by Guy Miller. However, the aircraft demonstrated greater than expected fuel consumption; the range with a standard payload was only ,  with a maximum payload. Three prototype aircraft: NX37097, NX41810, and NC45354 were built; one was used for testing radio equipment, while the other two were used for flight test evaluations. During testing, a few aircraft had difficulty with the simultaneous deployment of the right and left landing gear. With the same engines as the C-47, but  heavier (empty), the aircraft was relatively underpowered; it was reportedly said that, for an aircraft built by a railroad car company, it indeed handled like one.

At the Budd factory and airfield in Philadelphia, Pennsylvania, there were construction delays due to cost overruns and problems with stainless steel fabrication. By late 1943, aluminum production had been increased with the construction of new processing facilities, and other more conventional cargo aircraft (such as the Curtiss C-46 Commando and the Douglas C-47 Skytrain) were being produced in large numbers. This caused the Army to cancel its order for the C-93 and the Navy to reduce its RB-1 order from 200 to 25, of which 17 were delivered in March 1944.

On 13 April 1944, during a Naval Air Training Command (NATC) evaluation flight of RB-1 prototype U.S. Navy NX37097 at Patuxent River NAS, Maryland, the aircraft crashed, killing one of the crew. The aircraft was damaged beyond repair and written off, but the pilot reported that the stainless steel construction of the aircraft contributed to saving his life.

Production RB-1 aircraft never entered squadron service with the Navy, but a few were briefly used by Naval Air Stations as utility aircraft. With only 17 aircraft in inventory, the RB-1 was not feasible to maintain on the active list, and it was retired from U.S. Navy service in early 1945. The extant RB-1s were then transferred to the War Assets Administration (WAA) to be sold as war surplus. In 1945, the WAA sold 12 Conestogas to the National Skyway Freight Corp for $28,642 each (equivalent to $ in  dollars) at a time when new C-47s were selling for approximately $100,000 each (equivalent to $ million in  dollars). The new company, founded by members of the AVG Flying Tigers immediately sold four RB-1 aircraft to other buyers, which paid for the entire WAA contract.

The seven remaining National Skyways aircraft were used to transport a variety of cargo, shipping fruit and furniture from its base in Long Beach, California.  Pilots reported that the Budd transports were temperamental; in particular, exhaust stacks kept falling off and causing engine fires. There were three more crashes of Conestogas while in service with National Skyway Freight, one each in Virginia, New Mexico, and Michigan.  The crash in Virginia was a belly landing at a country club brought on by fuel exhaustion following weather-related problems. The Albuquerque, New Mexico crash was due to a downdraft during a snow storm,  from Albuquerque.<Widow of Lawrence Molloy Feemster, Ruth Mae (Feemster) Hill & preserved newspaper clippings> Pilot and copilot were killed when they were thrown through the windshield and the aircraft skidded over them; the flight engineer survived.

In 1947, the U.S. Army (and later the U.S. Air Force) gave National Skyway Freight a large contract for trans-Pacific freight, for which it leased military aircraft. The company changed its name to Flying Tiger and replaced the RB-1s with C-47s for its U.S. freight routes; the RB-1s were sold off to other buyers. One of these aircraft, a prototype RB-1, "NC45354" was sold to the Tucker Motor Company to transport its demonstration 1948 Tucker Sedan to auto shows around the U.S.; it was reportedly later abandoned at an airfield in Oakland, California after repeated mechanical troubles.

Brazil

The V.A.S.D. (Viação Aérea Santos Dumont) was born on January 18, 1944. He started with the purchase of two Catalinas and a Budd Conestoga, both former Rubber development Corporation. Budd RB.1 Conestoga had the PP-SDC "Tio Sam" enrollment. It was damaged in an emergency landing at Campo dos Afonsos on 04.01.1947, landing with one train collected, declared unrecoverable and there scrapped.

Surviving aircraft

A single unrestored Budd RB-1 is on display at the Pima Air & Space Museum in Tucson, Arizona.

Specifications (RB-1)

See also
 Fleetwings BT-12 Sophomore also a stainless steel design
Curtiss-Wright C-76 Caravan
 List of aircraft of World War II
 List of military aircraft of the United States
 List of United States Navy aircraft designations (pre-1962)

References

Notes

Citations

Bibliography

 Bridgeman, Leonard. “The Budd Conestoga.” Jane's Fighting Aircraft of World War II. London: Studio, 1946. .
 Merriam, Ray. U. S. Warplanes of World War II. Bennington Vermont: Merriam Press, 2000. .

External links

Flying Tiger Line
General Aviation News editorial
Pacific Aviation
A Story of the Budd RB-1 Conestoga

R1B
1940s United States military transport aircraft
High-wing aircraft
Aircraft first flown in 1943
Twin piston-engined tractor aircraft